Onkraj Meže is a dispersed settlement in the hills above the right bank of the Meža River in the Municipality of Mežica in the Carinthia region in northern Slovenia.

References

External links
Onkraj Meže on Geopedia

Populated places in the Municipality of Mežica